Matteo Morandi (born 8 October 1981) is an Italian artistic gymnast. He was born in Vimercate.  Morandi is married and has a daughter. He is a specialist at the rings.

Olympic Games

He competed at the 2004 games taking 5th place at the Rings, the 2008 games taking 6th place at the Rings, and the 2012 games, in which he won the bronze medal in the Still Rings final. After the 2012 Summer Olympics he said that he will continue until the next Olympic Games in Rio de Janeiro 2016 and hopes to win another medal.

World Championships

He won four bronze medals in the Rings at these games.  The first in Debrecen 2002, Anaheim 2003, Melbourne 2005 and Rotterdam 2010.

European Championships

In these games he won one gold, one silver and two bronze medals at the Rings.  In Lubiana 2004 he won a bronze medal, in Birmingham 2010 a gold medal, in Montpellier 2012 a silver medal and in 2013 Moscow a bronze medal.

Named skill
The "Morandi" is a Marinich-style handspring front flip in the tucked position. It was awarded a D value by the Code of Points.

References

1981 births
Living people
People from Vimercate
Italian male artistic gymnasts
Olympic gymnasts of Italy
Gymnasts at the 2004 Summer Olympics
Gymnasts at the 2008 Summer Olympics
Gymnasts at the 2012 Summer Olympics
Olympic bronze medalists for Italy
Olympic medalists in gymnastics
Medalists at the 2012 Summer Olympics
Medalists at the World Artistic Gymnastics Championships
European champions in gymnastics
Mediterranean Games gold medalists for Italy
Mediterranean Games silver medalists for Italy
Competitors at the 2005 Mediterranean Games
Competitors at the 2009 Mediterranean Games
Universiade medalists in gymnastics
Mediterranean Games medalists in gymnastics
Universiade bronze medalists for Italy
Gymnasts of Centro Sportivo Aeronautica Militare
Medalists at the 2005 Summer Universiade
Sportspeople from the Province of Monza e Brianza